Holly Mosher is an American filmmaker who produces and directs documentaries focused on social change. She directed the documentary Hummingbird. Mosher  produced Vanishing of the Bees and Side Effect. She started an independent film distribution company, Hummingbird Pictures, which focuses on socially-conscious films.

Career
Mosher graduated from New York University's Tisch School of the Arts. She worked as an assistant on films in Brazil and produced commercials.

Mosher made her directorial debut with the 2004 documentary, Hummingbird, a film about two organizations which work with Brazilian street children and women who are victims of domestic violence. She produced Side Effects in 2005 and Money Talks: Profits Before Patient Safety in 2006. Mosher also co-produced Maybe Baby in 2007. She was executive producer of Vanishing of the Bees, FREE FOR ALL! and Pay 2 Play: Democracy's High Stakes, a documentary about the influence of money in politics. In 2011, she directed Bonsai People: The Vision of Muhammad Yunus, a feature-length documentary about the work of Muhammad Yunus and the lending system he founded for people in poverty.

Filmography

Source

References

Year of birth missing (living people)
Living people
American documentary filmmakers
Tisch School of the Arts alumni